Courchamps may refer to the following places in France:

 Courchamps, Aisne, a commune in the department of Aisne
 Courchamps, Maine-et-Loire, a commune in the department of Maine-et-Loire